This is a summary of 1929 in music in the United Kingdom.

Events
22 January – Gordon Jacob's First String Quartet is premiered by the Spencer Dyke Quartet in London.
13 June – Eugene Goosens conducts the UK premieres of Igor Stravinsky's Concerto for Piano and Wind Instruments, with the composer as soloist, and of Ottorino Respighi's Feste Romane, at the Queen's Hall, London.
27 June – First London performances of two ballets by Igor Stravinsky, Apollon musagète and Le baiser de la fée, conducted by the composer at the Kingsway Hall and broadcast on the wireless.
12 October – Sir Thomas Beecham, supported by Peter Warlock, launches a six-day festival of the work of Frederick Delius, at the Queen's Hall in London. The composer attends in his wheelchair.
October – George Formby has a recording session with Dominion Records.
date unknown
Jimmy Campbell and Reg Connelly form their music publishing company as a result of the success of their song "Show Me the Way to Go Home".
Ray Noble becomes leader of the New Mayfair Dance Orchestra, an HMV Records studio band featuring members of many of the top hotel orchestras of the day.
Will Fyffe participates in a screen test, shot for Pathe in New York; it provides rare screen footage of his music hall act.

Popular music
 "Dear Little Cafe" w.m. Noël Coward
 "I Lift Up My Finger (and I Say "Tweet Tweet")" w.m. Leslie Sarony
 "Spread a Little Happiness" w.m. Vivian Ellis, recorded by Binnie Hale

Classical music: new works
 Kenneth J. Alford
 Old Panama
 HM Jollies
 Arnold Bax – Symphony No. 3
 Benjamin Britten – Rhapsody for String Quartet
 Alan Bush – Dialectic Op. 15 for string quartet
 Frederick Delius – Cynara
 David John de Lloyd – Forty Welsh Traditional Tunes (arrangements)
 John Ireland – Ballad
 William Walton – Viola Concerto

Opera
 Ralph Vaughan Williams – Sir John in Love

Musical theatre
12 July – Bitter Sweet, by Noël Coward, opens at His Majesty's Theatre.

Musical films
Auld Lang Syne, starring Sir Harry Lauder and Dorothy Boyd (silent film with soundtrack added later)
The Broken Melody, starring Enid Stamp Taylor (silent film with soundtrack added later)

Births
5 January – Norman Kay, composer (died 2001)
28 January – Acker Bilk, jazz clarinetist and band leader (died 2014)
14 February – Wyn Morris, conductor (died 2010)
25 February – Sandy Brown, Scottish clarinetist (died 1975)
5 April – Joe Meek, record producer (died 1967)
6 April – Edmund Percey, architect and jazz pianist (died 2014)
11 May – Stan Kane, Scottish-Canadian actor and singer (died 2015)
13 June – Alan Civil, horn player (died 1989)
9 July – Alex Welsh, Scottish singer, cornetist, and trumpeter (died 1982)
2 August – Roy Crimmins, trombonist and composer (died 2014)
5 August – John Armatage, drummer and arranger
11 August – Alun Hoddinott, composer (died 2008)
20 September – Joe Temperley, jazz saxophonist (died 2016)
2 October – Kenneth Leighton, pianist and composer (died 1988)
4 November – Dickie Valentine, singer (died 1971)
11 December – Kenneth MacMillan, ballet dancer and choreographer (died 1992)
date unknown – Maurice Handford, horn player (died 1986)

Deaths
12 February – Lillie Langtry, singer and actress, 75
22 August – Lucy Broadwood, folk song collector and researcher, 71
7 September – Frederic Weatherly, songwriter, 80
29 December – Josiah Booth, hymn-writer, 77

See also
 1929 in British television
 1929 in the United Kingdom
 List of British films of 1929

References

British Music, 1929 in
Music
British music by year
1920s in British music